Rosa 'Voodoo,  (aka AROmiclea), is a hybrid tea rose cultivar, bred by  Jack Christensen in 1984. The rose variety was created from the stock parents: grandiflora 'Camelot'; hybrid tea, 'First Prize'; hybrid tea, 'Typhoo Tea'; and hybrid tea, 'Lolita'. The cultivar  was named an All-America Rose Selections winner in 1986.

Description
'Voodoo' is a medium-tall upright shrub, 4 to 5 ft (120–150 cm) in height with a 2 to 3 ft (60–90 cm) spread. Blooms have an average diameter of 4-5 in (10-12  cm). Flowers are large and bloom in different shades of orange-pink, yellow, pink and crimson. Flowers have a moderate, sweet fragrance, with large high-centered, cupped petals. Flowers are borne singly on long stems, in small clusters of 26-40 petals. The leaves are healthy, glossy, and dark green in color. The plant is a vigorous grower and a repeat bloomer, and does very well in hot climates. It thrives in USDA zone 7b and warmer.

Child plants
 Rosa 'Anna's Promise', (2013) 
 Rosa 'Astor Perry', (2004) 
 Rosa 'Chris Evert' , (1997)
 Rosa 'Julia Child', (2006)
 Rosa 'Modern Magic', (1996) 
 Rosa 'Sunstruck', (2004) 
 Rosa 'We Salute You', (2005)

Awards 
 
 All-America Rose Selections winner, USA, (1984)

See also
Garden roses
Rose Hall of Fame
List of Award of Garden Merit roses

Notes

References

Voodoo